The Berezin B-20 (Березин Б-20) was a 20 mm caliber autocannon used by Soviet aircraft in World War II.

Development
The B-20 was created by Mikhail Yevgenyevich Berezin in 1944 by converting his 12.7 mm Berezin UB machine gun to use the 20 mm rounds used by the ShVAK cannon. No other changes were made to the weapon which was pneumatically or mechanically charged and was available in both synchronized and unsynchronized versions. In 1946, an electrically-fired version was created for the turrets of the Tupolev Tu-4 bomber until the Nudelman-Rikhter NR-23 cannon became available. The B-20 was a welcome replacement for the ShVAK because it was significantly lighter  - 25 kg (55 lb) to the 40 kg (80 lb) ShVAK - without sacrificing rate of fire or muzzle velocity.

Specifications
 Ammunition: 20×99mm
 Empty weight: 25 kg (55 lb)
 Muzzle velocity: 750–770 m/s (2,460-2,525 ft/s)
 Rate of fire: 800 rounds/min
 Mass of one-second burst: 0.95 kg (2.1 lb)

Production
The Soviet archives register the following production numbers by year:
 1944 — 2,275
 1945 — 7,240
 1946 — 440
 1947 — 780
 1948 — 1,686
 1949 — 2,931

See also
 List of Russian weaponry
Related developments:
 Berezin UB machine gun

Similar weapons:
 ShVAK cannon
 MG FF cannon
 MG 151 cannon
 Ho-5 cannon
 Hispano HS.404 cannon

Notes

References
 Широкоград А.Б. (2001) История авиационного вооружения Харвест (Shirokograd A.B. (2001) Istorya aviatsionnogo vooruzhenia Harvest. ) (History of aircraft armament)

20 mm artillery
Autocannons of the Soviet Union
Aircraft guns of the Soviet Union
KBP Instrument Design Bureau products
Weapons and ammunition introduced in 1944